Dermophis mexicanus, also known commonly as the Mexican burrowing caecilian or the Mexican caecilian, and locally as the tapalcua or tepelcua, is a species of limbless amphibian in the family Dermophiidae. The species is native to Mexico and Central America, where it burrows under leaf litter and plant debris.

Description

In general appearance, it resembles a large earthworm. Around a hundred transverse annular folds in the skin give the appearance of segments. The head has a pointed snout, a single row of teeth in the lower jaw, and two vestigial eyes covered with skin, with a pair of protrusible tentacles between the eyes and the nostrils. The body is elongated and there are no limbs. The upper surface is dark grey and the under surface pale grey with darker markings on the annuli.

Distribution and habitat
The Mexican burrowing caecilian is found in Mexico, Guatemala, El Salvador, Honduras, Nicaragua, and possibly Belize, mostly on the Atlantic side, but also in some isolated parts of the Pacific slope. Its natural habitats are subtropical or tropical dry forests, moist lowland forests, moist montane forests, plantations, rural gardens, and heavily degraded former forests. It is fossorial, living in damp, loose soil and under leaf litter, logs, and plant debris, often in banana and coffee plantations.

Biology
The Mexican burrowing caecilian feeds on invertebrates, including earthworms, termites, crickets, slugs, and snails. It emerges onto the ground surface on nights with light rainfall and catches small prey that come within its reach. Larger individuals may eat mice and small lizards. It moves by internal concertina-like movements and by undulating its body from side to side.

This caecilian is viviparous. Fertilisation is internal and up to 16 developing larvae subsist on the yolks of their eggs for three months. Then, they develop rasping teeth and feed on maternal glandular secretions, scraping the inside of the oviduct to stimulate their production. They then shed their larval teeth and rapidly grow a set of adult ones.

Status
The Mexican burrowing caecilian is listed as least concern in the IUCN Red List of Threatened Species. It has several disjunct populations, and in areas where it used to be abundant it now seems to be less common, and the locations in which it is found seem to be fewer in number. It may be persecuted in some locations because it superficially looks like a snake.

References

Further reading
Duméril A-M-C, Bibron G (1841). Erpétologie Générale ou Histoire Naturelle Complète des Reptiles, Tome huitième [volume 8]. Paris: Roret. ii + 784 pp. (Siphonops mexicanus, new species, pp. 284–285). (in French).

mexicanus
Amphibians described in 1841
Taxa named by André Marie Constant Duméril
Amphibians of Mexico
Amphibians of El Salvador
Amphibians of Guatemala
Amphibians of Honduras
Amphibians of Nicaragua
Taxonomy articles created by Polbot